Šimun Katalinić (17 September 1889 – 4 March 1977) was a Croatian rower who competed for Italy at the 1924 Summer Olympics.

In 1924, he won the bronze medal as crew member of the Italian boat in the men's eight competition with two brothers: Frane and Ante, and Latino Galasso, Vittorio Gliubich, Giuseppe Crivelli, Petar Ivanov, Bruno Sorić, Carlo Toniatti.

References

External links
 
 
 
 

1889 births
1977 deaths
Sportspeople from Zadar
Italian male rowers
Italian people of Croatian descent
Croatian male rowers
Olympic rowers of Italy
Rowers at the 1924 Summer Olympics
Olympic bronze medalists for Italy
Place of death missing
Olympic medalists in rowing
Medalists at the 1924 Summer Olympics
European Rowing Championships medalists